Mercury Capital is an Australian investment firm that owns a range of healthcare and media companies.

Assets
Blue Star Group, acquired January 2013
International Volunteer HQ, 80% shareholding acquired in November 2017
Are Media, acquired in June 2020 from Bauer Media Group.

References

 
Financial services companies based in Sydney
Investment companies of Australia